KWLB (93.1 FM) is a radio station licensed to Red Oak, Oklahoma, United States. The station is currently owned by Eastern Oklahoma State College

History
This station was assigned call sign KWLB on December 17, 2012.

References

External links
http://www.radio.eosc.edu/

WLB
Radio stations established in 2012